The King-in-Council or the Queen-in-Council, depending on the gender of the reigning monarch, is a constitutional term in a number of states. In a general sense, it would mean the monarch exercising executive authority, usually in the form of approving orders, on the advice of the country's executive council.

Norway
In Norway, the King in Council refers to the meetings of the King and the Council of State (the Cabinet), wherein matters of importance and major decisions are made. The Council meets at the Royal Palace, normally every Friday. These meetings are chaired by the monarch or, if he is ill or abroad, crown prince (the monarch's heir). In Norway's constitution, King in Council refers to the formal Government of Norway, whereas merely King means the appointed ministry that the law refers to may alone act with complete authority on the matter assigned in the particular law.

A decision that is taken in the State Council under the sovereign's leadership is considered to be a royal decree. If the crown prince chairs, they are crown prince resolutions. When neither the monarch nor the crown prince chairs, resolutions adopted are called government resolutions.

Sweden

In Sweden, the King in Council, more commonly known as Royal Majesty ( or the short forms Kungl.Maj or K.M:t) was a concept of constitutional importance in until 1974.

Royal Majesty was the commonly used term to refer to the supreme executive authority under the 1809 Instrument of Government, under which the monarch made all decisions of state in the presence of his Cabinet ministers. The 1974 Instrument of Government removed the monarch from all exercise of formal political powers, which were passed to the newly created government, chaired and led in all aspects by the prime minister. The monarch continues to head the Cabinet councils (the sovereign plus the members of the government) and the Council on Foreign Affairs, recognizing new cabinets (in the Council of State).

Commonwealth realms

The King-in-Council is the technical term of constitutional law for the exercise of executive authority in a Commonwealth realm, denoting the monarch acting by and with the advice and consent of his or her privy council (in the United Kingdom and Canada's federal jurisdiction) or executive council (in most other Commonwealth realms and the Australian states and Canadian provinces). In those realms and dependencies where the sovereign's powers and functions are delegated to a governor-general, lieutenant governor, or governor, the term Governor-General-in-Council, Lieutenant Governor-in-Council, or Governor-in-Council, respectively, may be used instead of King-in-Council, all of these terms describing the same technical process within constitutional law. The government of [jurisdiction] is commonly used as a synonym for any of the aforementioned terms, though the phrase may mean more than one thing in certain areas.

An order made by the King-in-Council is known as an order-in-council and such actions are subject to judicial review. Orders-in-council may be used to implement secondary legislation, such as British statutory instruments. In practice, decisions made by the King-in-Council are almost always the formal approval to decisions made by the cabinet, a subcommittee of the privy or executive council that includes the senior ministers of the Crown and often meets without the monarch or his local representative present.

Former Commonwealth realms and dependencies often retain a similar constitutional concept; for example, President-in-Council in India or Chief Executive-in-Council in Hong Kong. Similar concepts can also be found in some non-Commonwealth countries.

See also

Sweden
 Privy Council of Sweden
 Council of State (Sweden)

The Commonwealth
 King-in-Parliament
 King's Counsel
 Law officers of the Crown

Ireland
 Council of State (Ireland)

Notes

References

Australian constitutional law
Law of Canada
Constitution of the United Kingdom
Constitution of Norway
Constitution of Sweden
Monarchy in Canada
Monarchy in Australia
Monarchy in New Zealand